Yueyahu may refer to these places in China:

Yueyahu Subdistrict, in Qinhuai District, Nanjing, Jiangsu
Yueyahu Township, in Xingqing District, Yinchuan, Ningxia

See also
Yueya Lake (disambiguation)